Trand is a town in Battagram District in Khyber Pakhtunkhwa province of Pakistan, one of 20 union councils in the district. It is located at 34°37'60N 72°58'60E and has an altitude of 1,303 metres (4278 feet).

It is on the western border of Battagram, extending from Landi Kass to Garhi Nawab Syed. Kala Dhaka (known locally as Tore Ghar) lies at its Eastern-West side.  The majority of the population consists of the Peer Imami Sayyeds. The most influential political figure of the area was Jamal Khan, known as Khan of Trand,

References

Union councils of Battagram District
Populated places in Battagram District